Boryń refers to the following places in Poland:

 Boryń, Lubusz Voivodeship
 Boryń, Pomeranian Voivodeship